This is a list of video games considered controversial. The list includes games that have earned controversies for violence, sexual content, LGBT themes, racism, and review bombing from fans. Some of the video games on this list have been banned or regionally censored.

Video game series

1970s–1980s

1990s

2000s

2010s

2020s

See also
 List of banned video games
 List of regionally censored video games
 List of video games notable for negative reception

References

External links
 Sexual Moments in Video Game History from I-Mockery
 The Top 7... Controversies Waiting to Happen: Sex! Murder! Godless blasphemy and animal abuse! How could the media possibly miss these button-pushing games? by GamesRadar
 The Top 7... Most Evil Games: See the most racist, hateful and tasteless titles you wouldn't touch with a 10 foot pole by GamesRadar

 
Controversial
Video games